Revati in Hinduism, is the daughter of King Kakudmi and the wife of Balarama, the elder brother of Krishna.

Revati may also refer to:

 Revati (raga), a musical scale Carnatic music
 Revati (nakshatra), nakshatra or lunar mansion in Vedic astrology, referring to the multiple star system Zeta Piscium
 Revati (film), a 2005 Indian film
 Revathi Pattathanam, an annual assembly of scholars held in Kerala, India
 Revathi (born 1966), award-winning South Indian actress
 Revathi Sankaran, Tamil television personality / actress
 Revati, the proper name of the brightest component of the multiple star system Zeta Piscium

See also